Aleksey Igorevich Bardukov (born November 18, 1984) is a Russian theatre actor and dubbing. He appeared in over 40 films.

Early life
Aleksey was born on November 18, 1984 into a large family. In 2001, after graduating from school, Aleksey Bardukov successfully passed the exams simultaneously at the Russian Institute of Theatre Arts, at the Boris Shchukin Theatre Institute and at the Moscow Art Theatre School, but chose the Moscow Art Theatre, since the course was typed by Konstantin Raikin. 

In 2004 he made his first film debut.

Selected filmography

References

External links 
 Aleksey Bardukov on kino-teatr.ru

1984 births
Living people
Male actors from Moscow
Russian male film actors
Russian male stage actors
Russian male voice actors
Russian male television actors
21st-century Russian male actors